In 2013, the  in the Currie Cup and the Vodacom Cup.

Chronological list of events
26 January 2013: The Eastern Province Kings Vodacom Cup side beat national club champions College Rovers 19–14 in a warm-up game.
1 February 2013: The Eastern Province Kings Vodacom Cup side beat club side Despatch 21–5.
26 February 2013: Former South Africa Under-20 head coach Eric Sauls is appointed by the Eastern Province Rugby Union as the Manager of Coaching Development.
4 April 2013: Vodacom Cup and Under–21 full-back Kieran Goss signs for English Championship side Cornish Pirates.
9 May 2013: Vodacom Cup players Schalk Oelofse and Mzwanele Zito, along with former Vodacom Cup player Justin van Staden all join the  prior to their 2013 Currie Cup First Division campaign.

Players

Movement matrix

1 Ross Geldenhuys joined  during the 2013 Currie Cup.
2 Daniel Adongo joined the Indianapolis Colts during the 2013 Currie Cup.
3 Wesley Dunlop joined the US Montauban during the 2013 Currie Cup.
(did not play) indicates a player was included in a squad, but made no appearances in the competition.
(not in squad) indicates a player was not included in the squad, remained at the EP Kings and was in previous and future squads, usually due to a long-term injury.
(SR) indicates a player was not included in the squad for the 2013 Vodacom Cup, but did represent the Southern Kings in the 2013 Super Rugby season.

Vodacom Cup

Log

Round-by-round

Results

Player Statistics
The following table shows players statistics for the 2013 Vodacom Cup season:

 Ofentse Boloko, Albé de Swardt, Armand du Preez, Renier Erasmus, Zolani Faku, Heinrich Leonard, Siya Mangaliso, Kuhle Sonkosi, Andile Witbooi and Madoda Yako were named in the 2013 Vodacom Cup squad, but never included in a matchday 22.

Player Appearances

 Ofentse Boloko, Albé de Swardt, Armand du Preez, Renier Erasmus, Zolani Faku, Heinrich Leonard, Siya Mangaliso, Kuhle Sonkosi, Andile Witbooi and Madoda Yako were named in the 2013 Vodacom Cup squad, but never included in a matchday 22.

Currie Cup

Log

Round-by-round

Results

Player Statistics
The following table shows players statistics for the 2013 Currie Cup season:

 David Bulbring, Kevin Buys, Demetri Catrakilis, Zolani Faku, Shane Gates, Johan Herbst, Bandise Maku, Siya Mangaliso, SP Marais, Sphephelo Mayaba, Thabiso Mngomezulu, Waylon Murray, Norman Nelson, Foxy Ntleki, Paul Schoeman, Andries Strauss, Wimpie van der Walt, Luke Watson, Andile Witbooi and Madoda Yako were named in the 2013 Currie Cup squad, but never included in a matchday 22.

Player Appearances

 David Bulbring, Kevin Buys, Demetri Catrakilis, Zolani Faku, Shane Gates, Johan Herbst, Bandise Maku, Siya Mangaliso, SP Marais, Sphephelo Mayaba, Thabiso Mngomezulu, Waylon Murray, Norman Nelson, Foxy Ntleki, Paul Schoeman, Andries Strauss, Wimpie van der Walt, Luke Watson, Andile Witbooi and Madoda Yako were named in the 2013 Currie Cup squad, but never included in a matchday 22.

Under-21 Provincial Championship

Log

Round-by-round

Fixtures and Results

Players
The following players played during the 2013 Under-21 Provincial Championship Division B season:

Player Statistics
The following table shows players statistics for the 2013 Under-21 Provincial Championship season:

 Chad Banfield, Dylan Samuel Beckett, Masixole Caga, Frans Antonie Gerber, Arnold Klein, Glenwill Lewis, Ntsiki Mlamleli, Tau Mokonenyane, Khaya Molotana, Zuko Ndlela, Rousseau Prinsloo, Tyrone Rankin and Paul Schoeman were named in the 2013 Under-21 Provincial Championship squad, but never included in a matchday 22.

Player Appearances

 Chad Banfield, Dylan Samuel Beckett, Masixole Caga, Frans Antonie Gerber, Arnold Klein, Glenwill Lewis, Ntsiki Mlamleli, Tau Mokonenyane, Khaya Molotana, Zuko Ndlela, Rousseau Prinsloo, Tyrone Rankin and Paul Schoeman were named in the 2013 Under-21 Provincial Championship squad, but never included in a matchday 22.

Under-19 Provincial Championship

Log

Round-by-round

Fixtures and Results

Players
The following players played during the 2013 Under-19 Provincial Championship Division B season:

Player Statistics
The following table shows players statistics for the 2013 Under-19 Provincial Championship season:

 Darrel Curtis Coetzee, Justin Ferrant, Darren Ketzner, Wynand van der Merwe, Estiaan van der Westhuizen, Devon Chistopher van Eyck, Sean van Zyl, CJ Velleman and Hendrik Stephanus Venter were named in the 2013 Under-19 Provincial Championship squad, but never included in a matchday 22.

Player Appearances

 Darrel Curtis Coetzee, Justin Ferrant, Darren Ketzner, Wynand van der Merwe, Estiaan van der Westhuizen, Devon Chistopher van Eyck, Sean van Zyl, CJ Velleman and Hendrik Stephanus Venter were named in the 2013 Under-19 Provincial Championship squad, but never included in a matchday 22.

Awards

SARU Awards

The Kings received the following nomination for the SARU awards:

EP Kings Awards

The following awards were given to players for the 2013 season:

See also
Eastern Province Elephants
Southern Kings
2013 Super Rugby season
2013 Vodacom Cup
2013 Currie Cup First Division
2013 Under-21 Provincial Championship
2013 Under-19 Provincial Championship

External links

References

2013
2013 Currie Cup
2013 in South African rugby union